Kulattur  is a village in the Avudayarkoil block of Pudukkottai district, Tamil Nadu, India.

Demographics 
 census, Kulattur had a total population of 177 with 77 males and 100 females in 54 households, with 17 children of age 0–6. 41 men and 45 women were literate.

References

Villages in Pudukkottai district